Curome Cox (born February 28, 1981 in New York City) is a former American football safety. He was signed by the Atlanta Falcons as an undrafted free agent in 2004. He played college football at Maryland.

Cox has also been a member of the Denver Broncos, Houston Texans and New Orleans Saints.

Early years
Curome attended Gonzaga College High School in Washington D.C. before moving onto the Maryland Terrapins.

Professional career

Denver Broncos
Cox made an interception against the San Diego Chargers in the final regular season game. Due to injuries, Curome Cox has been thrust into the spotlight as a starting safety on the vaunted Broncos defense, next to John Lynch. On November 6, 2007 the Broncos released him.

Houston Texans
He signed with the Houston Texans on November 13. The Texans released him on June 13, 2008.

New Orleans Saints
On July 30, 2008, Cox was signed by the New Orleans Saints.

External links
Official Website
Denver Broncos bio
Houston Texans bio
Maryland Terrapins bio
New Orleans Saints bio

1981 births
Living people
Players of American football from New York City
African-American players of American football
People from Arlington County, Virginia
Players of American football from Washington, D.C.
American football safeties
Maryland Terrapins football players
Atlanta Falcons players
Denver Broncos players
Houston Texans players
New Orleans Saints players
Gonzaga College High School alumni
21st-century African-American sportspeople
20th-century African-American people